Emile (Emiel) van Lennep (15 January 19152 October 1996) was a Dutch official (treasurer general), diplomat and Minister of State.

Life
Van Lennep was born in Amsterdam as a son of Louis Henri van Lennep and Catharina Hildegonda Enschede. He studied law from 1932 to 1937 at the Municipal University of Amsterdam.

From 1951 to 1969 he was treasurer general, which is the highest official rank of the Dutch Ministry of Finance. From 1969 to 1984 he was secretary general of the Organisation for Economic Co-operation and Development (OECD).

Van Lennep was instrumental in making the OECD a more effective forum for international cooperation. In the 1970s he was named several times to be a candidate for a function in the government of the Netherlands, but he did not have political aspirations. After his career at the OECD he was appointed to be Minister of State from 1986 until his death in 1996.

In 1987 he was appointed one of the members of a distinguished external panel to conduct a review of the Asian Development Bank.  The results of the review were issued in 1989 as the Report of a Panel on the Role of the Asian Development Bank in the 1990s.

He married Alexa Labberton and had two sons and two daughters. In 1990 he was rewarded with a Four Freedoms Award in the category freedom from want. Van Lennep died in 1996 at the age of 81 years.

References 
Biografisch Woordenboek van Nederland 6, biography 

1915 births
1996 deaths
20th-century Dutch diplomats
Jonkheers of the Netherlands
Ministers of State (Netherlands)
Commanders of the Order of the Netherlands Lion
Commanders of the Order of Orange-Nassau
Diplomats from Amsterdam
Recipients of the Four Freedoms Award
Treasurers-General